A subregion is a part of a larger region or continent and is usually based on location. Cardinal directions, such as south are commonly used to define a subregion.

United Nations subregions 

The Statistics Division of the United Nations (UN) is in charge of the collection, processing, and dissemination of statistical information for the UN. In 1999, it developed a system of macro-geographical (continental) regions, subregions, and other selected economic groups to report advances towards achieving numerous millennial development goals worldwide. These statistical divisions were devised for statistical purposes and is used for carrying out statistical analysis. The division's first publication was the book World's Women 2000: Trends and Statistics in 2000.
 
According to the UN, the assignment of countries or areas to specific groupings is for statistical convenience and does not imply any assumption regarding political or other affiliation of countries or territories.

Subregions by continent 
The following is a non-exhaustive list of subregions, arranged alphabetically by region (i.e., by continent); in the UN geoscheme, higher-level, macro-geographical regions are arranged to the extent possible according to continents.

Afro-Eurasia

Africa 
 by the United Nations Statistics Division's geoscheme (see also: UN geoscheme for Africa):
 Northern Africa
 Eastern Africa
 Central or Middle Africa
 Southern Africa
 Western Africa

 by geography:
 North Africa (Also known as Saharan Africa)
 Maghreb (AKA Northwest Africa, also including Mauritania, which most geographers consider as a part of West Africa; some geographers consider Libya as a part of Northeast Africa and Western Sahara as a part of West Africa)
 Northeast Africa (including Egypt, the Horn of Africa, and the Sudans; some geographers consider Egypt, Libya, and the Sudan as Northeast Africa instead)
 Sub-Saharan Africa (AKA Tropical Africa)
 Central Africa (AKA Congo, Equatorial Africa or Middle Africa)
 East Africa (AKA Nile)
 Northeast Africa (including Egypt, the Horn of Africa, and the Sudans; some geographers consider Egypt, Libya, and the Sudan as Northeast Africa instead)
 Horn of Africa
 Southeast Africa (also including Botswana, Eswatini and Lesotho, which most geographers consider as part of Southern Africa)
 Southern Africa (AKA Kalahari)
 West Africa (AKA Niger)
 Guinea (region)
 Sudan (region)

 by physiography:
 Congo Basin
 Kalahari Basin
 Kalahari Desert
 Namib
 Nile Basin
 Sahara
 Sahel
 Sudanian savanna
 East Sudanian savanna
 Sudd
 West Sudanian savanna

 by economics:
 African Monetary Union (AMU)
 Arab League (including some Western Asian countries)
 Common Market for Eastern and Southern Africa (COMESA)
 Common Monetary Area (CMA)
 Community of Sahel–Saharan States (CEN-SAD)
 Council of Arab Economic Unity (GAFTA) – including some Western Asian countries
 Economic Community of Central African States (ECCAS)
 Economic Community of West African States (ECOWAS)
 EMEA (including Europe and the Middle East)
 Southern African Customs Union (SACU)
 Southern African Development Community (SADC)
 Union for the Mediterranean (including most European countries and some Western Asian countries)

 by biogeography:
 Macaronesia

 by historical division:
 Negroland

 by geology:
 Kaapvaal Craton
 Zimbabwe Craton

Eurasia

Asia 
 by the United Nations Statistics Division's geoscheme (see also: UN geoscheme for Asia):
 Central Asia
 Eastern Asia
 South-eastern Asia
 Southern Asia
 Western Asia

 by geography:
 Central Asia
 East Asia
 Greater China
 China
 Hong Kong (some geographers consider it as a part of Northeast Asia)
 Macau (some geographers consider it as a part of Northeast Asia)
 Mainland China (some geographers consider it as a part of Northeast Asia)
 North China (Eastern Inner Mongolia is also a part of Northeast China)
 Northeast China (AKA Manchuria) – also a part of Northeast Asia
 Southeast China (excluding Central China)
 East China (some geographers include Taiwan Island, Penghu, Kinmen, the Matsu Islands, Socotra Rock, Parangcho, and the Senkaku Islands in this subregion)
 South Central China
 Central China
 South China (including Hainan Island and the South China Sea Islands, some geographers also include Hong Kong and Macau in this subregion)
 Western China
 Northwest China (some geographers consider Qinghai and Xinjiang as part of Central Asia)
 Southwest China (some geographers consider Tibet as a part of Central Asia)
 South China Sea Islands (some geographers consider them as part of Northeast Asia)
 Paracel Islands
 Pratas Island
 Spratly Islands
 James Shoal (undersea feature)
 Taiping Island
 Zhongzhou Reef
 Zhongsha Islands
 Macclesfield Bank
 Walker Shoal
 Scarborough Shoal
 Taiwan (some geographers consider it as a part of Northeast Asia)
 Mongolia (some geographers consider it as a part of Central Asia or Northeast Asia)
 Northeast Asia
 China
 Eastern Inner Mongolia
 Northeast China (AKA Manchuria)
 Japan
 Daitō Islands
 Mainland Japan
 Hokkaido
 Honshu
 Kyushu
 Shikoku
 Nanpō Islands
 Ryukyu Islands
 Korea
 North Korea
 South Korea
 Russian Far East (also a part of North Asia, but not a part of East Asia)
 Outer Manchuria
 North Asia (AKA Siberia)
 Russian Far East (also a part of Northeast Asia)
 Outer Manchuria
 South Asia
 Eastern South Asia
 India
 Andaman and Nicobar Islands
 Lakshadweep
 Mainland India
 Central India
 East India
 Northeast India
 North India
 South India (AKA Peninsular India, including the Andaman and Nicobar Islands and Lakshadweep)
 Western India
 Southeast Asia
 Mainland Southeast Asia
 Malay Peninsula
 Peninsular Malaysia
 Southern Thailand
 Tanintharyi Region
 Maritime Southeast Asia
 Borneo (including Labuan)
 Brunei
 East Malaysia
 Labuan
 Sabah
 Sarawak
 Kalimantan
 Western Asia (AKA Southwest Asia)
 Anatolia (AKA Asia Minor)
 Arabia
 Eastern Arabia
 Hejaz (AKA Western Arabia)
 Najd (AKA Central Arabia)
 South Arabia
 Levant
 Southern Levant
 Mesopotamia
 South Caucasus (AKA Transcaucasia)

 by physiography:
 Anatolian Peninsula
 Arabian Peninsula
 Central Plateau
 Indian Ocean Coast
 Persian Gulf Coast
 Red Sea Coast
 Bahrain Island
 Caucasus Mountains
 Greater Caucasus
 Lesser Caucasus
 Daitō Islands
 Eurasian Steppe
 Fertile Crescent
 Mesopotamia
 Hainan Island
 Himalayas
 Eastern Himalaya
 Western Himalaya
 Siachen Glacier
 Indian subcontinent
 Deccan Plateau
 Indochinese Peninsula
 Indo-Gangetic Plain
 Indus Valley
 Iranian Plateau
 Japanese Archipelago
 Hokkaido
 Honshu
 Kuril Islands
 Kyushu
 Ryukyu Islands
 Okinawa Island
 Sakhalin Island
 Shikoku
 Jeju Island
 Junggar Basin
 Kolyma
 Korean Peninsula
 Leizhou Peninsula
 Liaodong Peninsula
 Malay Archipelago (including New Guinea)
 Indonesian Archipelago
 Maluku Islands
 Sunda Islands
 Greater Sunda Islands
 Borneo
 Java
 Sulawesi
 Sumatra
 Lesser Sunda Islands
 Alor Archipelago
 Bali
 Barat Daya Islands
 Flores
 Komodo
 Lombok
 Sumba
 Sumbawa
 Tanimbar Islands
 Timor
 Philippine Archipelago
 Luzon
 Mindanao
 Visayan Islands
 Mongolian Plateau
 Nanpō Islands
 Bonin Islands
 Volcano Islands
 Qinghai Lake
 Shandong Peninsula
 Sichuan Basin
 Sri Lanka Island
 Taiwan Island
 Tarim Basin

 by geopolitics:
 Asia-Pacific (APAC) – including Oceania
 Far East
 Greater China
 China proper
 Inner Mongolia
 Manchuria
 Tibet
 Xinjiang
 Indochinese Peninsula
 Japanese Archipelago
 Korean Peninsula
 Malay Archipelago
 Russian Far East
 Greater Middle East – including some African countries
 Middle East and North Africa (AKA MENA) – including North African countries
 Middle East (AKA the Near East) – including Egypt
 Arab League (AKA the Arab states) – including some African countries
 Mashriq – including Egypt and the Sudan
 Arabian Peninsula
 Levant – including Ash-Shām and Cyprus
 Mesopotamia (modern-day Iraq)
 Asia Minor
 South Caucasus (AKA Transcaucasia)
 The 'stans
 Indian subcontinent
 Himalayan states – including China
 Eastern Himalaya
 Western Himalaya
 Kashmir

 by economics:
 Arab League – including some African countries
 ASEAN Free Trade Area
 Asia Cooperation Dialogue (ACD) – including Russia
 Asian Clearing Union (ACU)
 Asia-Pacific Economic Cooperation (APEC) – including Oceania
 Association of Southeast Asian Nations (ASEAN)
 Bamboo network
 Bangladesh, Bhutan, India, Nepal Initiative (BBIN)
 Bay of Bengal Initiative for Multi-Sectoral Technical and Economic Cooperation (BIMSTEC)
 Council of Arab Economic Unity (GAFTA) – including some African countries
 EMEA (including Africa and Europe)
 Eurasian Customs Union (ECU) – including Belarus
 Eurasian Economic Union (EEU) – including Belarus
 Greater Mekong Subregion
 Gulf Cooperation Council (GCC)
 South Asian Association for Regional Cooperation (SAARC)
 South Asian Free Trade Area (SAFTA)
 South Asia Subregional Economic Cooperation (SASEC)
 Union for the Mediterranean (including most European countries and some African countries)

 by culture:
 Eastern world
 East Asian cultural sphere
 Greater China
 Eastern and western China
 Northern and southern China
 China proper
 Manchuria
 Japan
 Korea
 Nanyang
 Vietnam
 Greater India
 Eastern Afghanistan
 Indian subcontinent
 Himalayan states
 Indian Himalayan Region
 Mainland Southeast Asia
 Maritime Southeast Asia
 Tibet
 Yunnan
 Greater Mongolia
 Inner Mongolia
 Outer Mongolia
 Muslim world (AKA the Islamic world)
 Arab world
 Mashriq
 Arabia
 Al-Bahrain
 Al-Yamama
 Hadhramaut
 Tihamah
 Malay world
 Greater Indonesia
 Nusantara
 Turkic world
 Azerbaijan
 Soviet Central Asia (excluding Tajikistan)
 Turkey
 Xinjiang
 Dzungaria
 South Xinjiang

 by religion:
 Abrahamic religions (Western Asian religions or Western religions)
 Eastern religions
 Dharmic religions (Indian religions)
 Taoic religions (East Asian religions or Far Eastern religions)

 by biogeography:
 Eastern Asia
 Malesia

 by historical division:
 East Indies (AKA the Indies)
 Farther India (AKA Ultraindia)
 Indochina
 Insulindia

 by geology:
 Izu–Bonin–Mariana Arc
 Kuril Island Arc
 Northeastern Japan Arc
 Ryukyu Island Arc
 Sakhalin Island Arc
 Southwestern Japan Arc

Europe 
 by the United Nations Statistics Division's geoscheme (see also: UN geoscheme for Europe):
 Eastern Europe – the UN includes North Asia (Siberia) and part of Central Europe (Czech Republic, Hungary, Poland and Slovakia) in this subregion
 Northern Europe – the UN includes the British Isles and the Baltic states in this subregion
 Southern Europe – the UN includes Slovenia (Central Europe) in this subregion
 Western Europe – the UN includes part of Central Europe (the DACH countries and Liechtenstein) in this subregion

 by geography:
 Central and Eastern Europe
 Central Europe
 Eastern Europe
 Caucasus
 North Caucasus (aka Ciscaucasia)
 South Caucasus (aka Transcaucasia) – a subregion of Western Asia
 Northern Europe
 North-central Europe
 Scandinavia
 North-eastern Europe
 North-western Europe
 Southern Europe
 South-central Europe
 Apennine Peninsula (aka the Italian Peninsula)
 Malta
 South-eastern Europe
 Balkan Peninsula (aka the Balkans)
 Romania
 South-western Europe
 Balearic Islands
 Iberian Peninsula (aka Iberia)
 Southern France
 Western Europe

 by physiography:
 Apennine Peninsula (aka the Italian Peninsula)
 Balkan Peninsula
 British Isles
 Great Britain
 Hebrides
 Ireland
 Isle of Man
 Isle of Wight
 Caucasus Mountains
 Greater Caucasus
 Lesser Caucasus – A part of Western Asia
 Channel Islands
 Guernsey
 Jersey
 Eurasian Steppe
 Fennoscandian Peninsula
 Kola Peninsula
 Scandinavian Peninsula
 Great European Plain
 East European Plain
 Iberian Peninsula
 Mediterranean Basin

 by geopolitics:
 East-Central Europe
 Eastern Europe
 Post-Soviet states
 Baltic states
 Commonwealth of Independent States
 Union State
 North Caucasus
 Georgia
 Ukraine
 West-Central Europe 
 Western Europe
 European Union (EU)
 NATO
 North Sea Commission (NSC)

 by economics:
 Central European Free Trade Agreement (CEFTA)
 Commonwealth of Independent States Free Trade Area (CISFTA) – including Armenia and most Central Asian countries
 Comprehensive Economic and Trade Agreement (CETA) – including Canada
 EMEA (including Africa and the Middle East)
 Eurasian Customs Union (EACU) – including Armenia and Kyrgyzstan
 Eurasian Economic Union (EAEU) – including Armenia and Kyrgyzstan
 European Economic Area (EEA) – including Cyprus
 European Free Trade Association (EFTA)
 European Single Market (including Cyprus)
 European Union Customs Union (EUCU) – including Cyprus and Turkey
 European Union–Turkey Customs Union (including Cyprus and Turkey)
 Eurozone (including Cyprus)
 North Sea Region (NSR)
 Union for the Mediterranean (UfM) – including some Western Asian countries and some African countries
 Union State

 by culture:
 Balkans
 Eastern Balkans
 Western Balkans
 Baltic states
 Benelux
 Belgium
 Netherlands
 Luxembourg
 Mediterranean Region
 Nordic countries and Karelia
 North Sea Region
 Sápmi, since 1809 divided between Finland and Sweden
 Scandinavia
 Visegrád Group

 by language:
 Celtic-speaking Europe
 Germanic-speaking Europe
 DACH countries
 Germany (Deutschland)
 Austria
 Switzerland (Confoederatio Helvetica)
 Romance-speaking Europe (aka Latin Europe)
 Slavic-speaking Europe

 by religion:
 Eastern religions
 Indian religions
 Buddhism in Europe (Kalmykia)
 Western religions (Abrahamic religions or Western Asian religions)
 Christianity in Europe
 Catholicism in Europe
 Eastern Orthodoxy in Europe
 Protestantism in Europe
 Islam in Europe

 by biogeography:
 Mediterranean Region

 by historical division:
 Celtic tribes
 East–West Schism
 Catholic Church
 Eastern Orthodox Church
 Germanic tribes
 Greco-Roman world
 Hellenistic world
 Roman Empire
 Eastern Roman Empire
 Western Roman Empire
 Iranian tribes
 Iron Curtain
 Eastern Bloc
 Western Bloc
 Reformation (Protestantism)
 Slavic tribes
 Turkic tribes

 by geology:
 Alpine orogeny
 East European craton
 Baltic Shield
 Ukrainian Shield

Americas 

 by the United Nations Statistics Division's geoscheme (see also: UN geoscheme for the Americas):
 Latin America and the Caribbean     
 Caribbean – the UN includes the Lucayan Archipelago in this subregion
 Latin America
 Central America – the UN includes Mexico in this subregion
 South America
 Northern America

 by culture:
 Anglo-America
 Latin America
 French America
 Ibero-America
 Hispanic America
 Portuguese America

 by economics:
 Community of Latin American and Caribbean States (CELAC)

North America 
 by geography:
 Middle America
 Caribbean (Insular America)
 Aves Island
 West Indies
 Antilles
 Greater Antilles
 Hispaniola
 Lesser Antilles
 Leeward Islands
 Saint Martin island
 SSS islands
 Virgin Islands
 British Virgin Islands
 Spanish Virgin Islands
 United States Virgin Islands
 Southern Caribbean
 Leeward Antilles
 ABC islands
 Windward Islands
 Lucayan Archipelago
 Central America
 San Andrés and Providencia
 Bajo Nuevo Bank
 Serranilla Bank
 Mexico
 Northern America
 Bermuda
 Canada
 Eastern Canada
 Atlantic Canada
 The Maritimes
 Central Canada
 Northern Canada
 Canadian Arctic Archipelago
 Western Canada
 Canadian Prairies
 West Coast
 Greenland
 Saint Pierre and Miquelon
 United States (excluding Hawaii)
 Alaska
 Contiguous United States
 Central United States
 Middle America (United States)
 Midwestern United States
 Eastern United States
 Northeastern United States
 Southeastern United States
 Northern United States
 Great Lakes region (including Ontario, Canada)
 Southern United States
 South Central United States
 Western United States (including Alaska and Hawaii)
 Northwestern United States
 Southwestern United States (some geographers include the Oklahoma Panhandle and West Texas in this subregion)

 by physiography:
 Atlantic coastal plain
 Atlantic Seaboard Fall Line
 East Coast of the United States
 Great Basin
 Great Basin Desert
 Great Lakes
 Great Lakes Basin
 Great Plains
 Gulf Coast of the United States
 Piedmont
 West Coast of the United States

 by geopolitics:
 Dutch Caribbean
 Caribbean Netherlands (AKA the BES islands)
 Organisation of Eastern Caribbean States
 Red states and blue states
 Western Caribbean zone

 by economics:
 Caribbean Community (CARICOM)
 Central America Free Trade Agreement (CAFTA)
 Great Lakes Megalopolis
 Mesoamerican region
 North American Free Trade Agreement (NAFTA)
 Northeast megalopolis
 Organisation of Eastern Caribbean States
 Petrocaribe

 by culture:
 Heartland (United States)
 Mesoamerica
 Oasisamerica

 by biogeography:
 Aridoamerica

 by geology:
 Canadian Shield
 North American craton
 Slave craton
 Superior craton
 Wyoming craton

South America 
 by geography:
 Eastern South America: Federative Republic of Brazil
 Northern South America (the part of South America located in the Northern Hemisphere)
 North-eastern South America: The Guianas
 North-western South America: Caribbean South America
 Southern South America: Southern Cone
 Western South America: Andean States

 by physiography:
 Altiplano
 Amazon basin
 Amazon rainforest
 Andes
 Brazilian Highlands
 Gran Chaco
 Pampa
 Pantanal
 Patagonia

 by economics:
 Andean Community
 Mercosur
 Union of South American Nations

 by geology: 
 Guiana Shield

Antarctica 
 by the United Nations Statistics Division's geoscheme:
 Antarctica

 by geography:
 Antarctic and Subantarctic islands
 Bouvet Island (some geographers consider it as a part of South America)
 French Southern Territories (excluding Adélie Land and the Scattered Islands)
 Crozet Islands (some geographers consider them as part of Africa)
 Kerguelen Islands (some geographers consider them as part of Africa)
 Saint Paul and Amsterdam Islands (some geographers consider them as part of Africa)
 Heard Island and McDonald Islands (some geographers consider them as part of Oceania)
 Macquarie Island (some geographers consider it as a part of Oceania)
 New Zealand Subantarctic Islands (some geographers consider them as part of Oceania)
 Antipodes Islands
 Auckland Islands
 Bounty Islands
 Campbell Islands
 Snares Islands
 Peter I Island
 Prince Edward Islands (some geographers consider them as part of Africa)
 South Georgia and the South Sandwich Islands (some geographers consider them as part of South America)
 South Orkney Islands
 South Shetland Islands
 Mainland Antarctica
 East Antarctica
 Transantarctic Mountains
 West Antarctica
 Antarctic Peninsula

Oceania 
 by the United Nations Statistics Division's geoscheme (see also: UN geoscheme for Oceania):
 Australia and New Zealand – the UN includes the Cato, Elizabeth, and Middleton reefs, the Lord Howe Island Group, and Norfolk Island in this subregion
 Melanesia – the UN includes New Caledonia and New Guinea in this subregion
 Micronesia
 Polynesia – the UN excludes New Zealand from this subregion

 by geography:
 Australasia
 Australia–New Guinea
 Australia (excluding the Australian Indian Ocean Territories, Heard Island and McDonald Islands and Norfolk Island)
 Ashmore and Cartier Islands
 Coral Sea Islands Territory (excluding the Cato, Elizabeth, and Middleton reefs)
 Mainland Australia
 Australian Capital Territory
 Jervis Bay Territory
 New South Wales (excluding the Lord Howe Island Group)
 Northern Territory
 Queensland
 South Australia
 Victoria
 Western Australia
 Tasmania (excluding Macquarie Island)
 New Guinea (some geographers consider it as a part of Melanesia)
 Papua New Guinea (excluding the New Guinea Islands Region)
 Western New Guinea
 Papua
 West Papua
 Australian Indian Ocean Territories
 Christmas Island
 Cocos (Keeling) Islands
 Heard Island and McDonald Islands
 Heard Island
 McDonald Islands
 Macquarie Island
 Zealandia
 Cato Reef
 Elizabeth Reef
 Lord Howe Island Group
 Middleton Reef
 New Caledonia (also a part of Melanesia)
 New Zealand (some geographers consider it as a part of Polynesia)
 New Zealand outlying islands (excluding the Kermadec Islands)
 Chatham Islands
 New Zealand Subantarctic Islands
 Antipodes Islands
 Auckland Islands
 Bounty Islands
 Campbell Islands
 Snares Islands
 Solander Islands
 Three Kings Islands
 Norfolk Island
 Pacific Islands
 Melanesia (some geographers consider it as a part of Australasia)
 Island Melanesia
 Fiji (excluding Rotuma)
 New Caledonia (also a part of Zealandia)
 New Guinea Islands Region (excluding Bougainville)
 Santa Cruz Islands
 Solomon Islands (archipelago)
 Bougainville
 Solomon Islands (excluding the Santa Cruz Islands)
 Vanuatu
 New Guinea (also a part of Australia–New Guinea)
 Micronesia (some geographers include the Bonin Islands and the Volcano Islands in this subregion)
 Mariana Islands
 Guam
 Northern Mariana Islands
 Wake Island
 Polynesia (some geographers include Clipperton Island in this subregion)
 Cook Islands
 Easter Island
 Salas and Gómez Island
 French Polynesia
 Tahiti
 Hawaiian Islands
 Northwestern Hawaiian Islands
 Midway Atoll
 Southeastern Hawaiian Islands
 Howland and Baker Islands
 Baker Island
 Howland Island
 Kermadec Islands
 Niue
 Pitcairn, Henderson, Ducie and Oeno Islands
 Rotuma
 Samoan Islands
 American Samoa (excluding Swains Island)
 Samoa
 Tokelau Islands
 Swains Island
 Tokelau
 Tonga
 Tuvalu
 Wallis and Futuna
 Alo
 Sigave
 Uvea

 by human geography:
 Near Oceania
 Remote Oceania

 by biogeography:
 Papuasia
 East Melanesian Islands

 by geology (see also: Geology of Australia):
 Archaean
 Australian Shield
 Centralian Superbasin
 Gawler Craton
 Narryer gneiss
 Ore genesis
 Perth Basin
 Pilbara Craton
 Western Plateau
 Yilgarn Craton

See also 
 Autonomous administrative division
 Continent
 Continental fragment
 European Committee of the Regions
 Euroregion
 List of continents and continental subregions by population
 List of Latin names of regions
 Military district
 Polar regions of Earth
 Region
 Regional district
 Regional municipality
 Subcontinent
 Submerged continent
 Supercontinent
 United Nations geoscheme

References

External links 
 UN Statistics Division – Standard country or area codes for statistical use (M49)

Types of geographical division
Regions
Continents